Gallegati is an Italian surname. Notable people with the surname include:

Ercole Gallegati (1911–1990), Italian wrestler
Mauro Gallegati (born 1958), Italian economist

Italian-language surnames